The 1989, Campeonato Paulista da Primeira Divisão de Futebol Profissional was the 88th season of São Paulo's top professional football league. São Paulo won the championship by the 16th time. no teams were relegated.

Championship
The twenty-two teams of the championship were divided into two groups of eleven teams, with each team playing once against the teams of its own group and the other group. The three best teams of each group, plus the six overall best teams aside of them would qualify to the Third phase. The group phase also had peculiar rules regarding points: wins with three or more goals scored were worth an extra point, and goalless ties had to be followed by a penalty shootout, worth one point for the winner and none for the loser.

The Second phase's twelve teams were divided into four groups of three, with each team playing twice against the teams of its own group, with the best team of each group qualifying to the Semifinals, with their winners qualifying to the finals.

First phase

Group 1

Group 2

Second phase

Group 1

Group 2

Group 3

Group 4

Semifinals

|}

Finals

|}

References

Campeonato Paulista seasons
Paulista